Rear Admiral Robert St Vincent Sherbrooke,  (8 January 1901 – 13 June 1972) was a senior officer in the Royal Navy and a recipient of the Victoria Cross, the highest award for gallantry in the face of the enemy that can be awarded to British and Commonwealth forces.

Early life
Born in Oxton, Nottinghamshire, Sherbrooke attended the Royal Naval Colleges of Osborne and Dartmouth and joined the Royal Navy in 1917 as a midshipman aboard . He was promoted to commander in 1935 and served aboard the aircraft carrier . His wartime commands were all destroyers.

Victoria Cross
Sherbrooke was 41 years old and a captain in the Royal Navy during the Second World War when the following deed took place during the Battle of the Barents Sea for which he was awarded the VC.

Sherbrooke's actions – and the German ships' failure to neutralize the convoy despite its superior force – were pivotal in Hitler's order to end the use of surface fleet of the Kriegsmarine at the beginning of 1943.

Later life
From July 1945 to mid-1946, Sherbrooke was commanding officer of the cruiser . He later achieved the rank of rear admiral.

He was appointed High Sheriff of Nottinghamshire for 1958–59. His daughter is Dione Digby, Lady Digby.

He died in his home town of Oxton, aged 71.

References

External links
Captain R.S.V. Sherbrooke in The Art of War exhibition at the UK National Archives
Location of grave and VC medal (Nottinghamshire)
Royal Navy Officers 1939–1945

1901 births
1972 deaths
Burials in Nottinghamshire
People from Newark and Sherwood (district)
Royal Navy rear admirals
Companions of the Order of the Bath
Free Foresters cricketers
Companions of the Distinguished Service Order
People educated at the Royal Naval College, Osborne
Royal Navy officers of World War I
Royal Navy officers of World War II
Royal Navy recipients of the Victoria Cross
British World War II recipients of the Victoria Cross
Lord-Lieutenants of Nottinghamshire
High Sheriffs of Nottinghamshire
Military personnel from Nottinghamshire
Recipients of the King Haakon VII Freedom Cross